Ancylobothrys (sometimes spelled Ancylobotrys) is a genus of plant in the family Apocynaceae found in tropical and southern Africa.  the World Checklist of Selected Plant Families recognises 7 species:

Species
 Ancylobothrys amoena Hua - W + C + E Africa 
 Ancylobothrys capensis (Oliv.) Pichon - Botswana, South Africa 
 Ancylobothrys petersiana (Klotzsch) Pierre - E + C + S Africa, Comoros, Madagascar; naturalized in Mauritius 
 Ancylobothrys pyriformis Pierre - C Africa 
 Ancylobothrys robusta Pierre - C Africa 
 Ancylobothrys scandens (Schumach.) Pichon  W + C Africa 
 Ancylobothrys tayloris (Stapf) Pichon - Kenya, Tanzania, Malawi, Mozambique

References

 
Apocynaceae genera
Flora of Africa